The Purgatoire River is a river in southeastern Colorado, United States.  The river is also known locally as the Purgatory River or the Picketwire River. Purgatoire means Purgatory in French. French trappers named the river to commemorate Spanish explorers killed in a Native American attack.

The Purgatoire River originates at the confluence of the North Fork Purgatoire and Middle Fork Purgatoire rivers near Weston in Las Animas County, Colorado. It flows generally east-northeastward   to a confluence with the Arkansas River in John Martin Reservoir State Park near Las Animas in Bent County, Colorado.  

The Purgatoire River drains an area of : 96.4 percent of this area is in Colorado, and the remaining 3.6 percent is in New Mexico.

The Piñon Canyon Maneuver Site is a large military base located along the western bank of the Purgatoire River.  Citizens groups opposed plans of the U.S. Army to expand the base. On November 25, 2013, the U.S. Army announced that its plan to expand the Piñon Canyon Maneuver site had been cancelled.

In popular culture 
The river is frequently referred to as the Picketwire River in the film The Man Who Shot Liberty Valance (1962), and once in the film True Grit (2010). This is a folk-etymologizing anglophone phonological approximation of the French pronunciation , developed by English-speaking settlers who later came to the area.

The Purgatoire River is referenced in the 2017 Netflix miniseries Godless. It is also mentioned as the Purgatory in the Pulitzer Prize winning book Lonesome Dove by Larry McMurtry, as the place where the renegade Blue Duck goes into hiding.

See also
List of rivers in Colorado
Purgatoire River track site
Comanche National Grassland

References

Rivers of Colorado
Tributaries of the Arkansas River
Rivers of Las Animas County, Colorado
Rivers of Bent County, Colorado